Displaced is a 2010 documentary film directed by the Somali-American filmmaker Idil Ibrahim about the recruitment of Somali-American young men into the civil war in Somalia and the effect their disappearance has on their families. Her directorial debut, it was released as part of the Tribeca Film Institute's Tribeca All Access program. The Iranian-Canadian-American filmmaker Anna Fahr served as a producer on the project.

References

External links

Zeila Films

2010 films
American documentary films
Somali Civil War (2009–present)
Documentary films about jihadism
Films shot in Somalia
2010 directorial debut films
2010s English-language films
2010s American films